Kiril Nikolov (born 18 June 1976 in Dupnitsa) is a former Bulgarian footballer who played as a midfielder.

Career
Nikolov start to play football in Marek Dupnitsa. After that played for F.C. Metalurg Pernik, Minyor Pernik, Litex Lovech, Portuguese S.C. Braga, Marek, Azerbaijani Turan Tovuz, Greek Aiolikos F.C., Slavia Sofia and Pirin Blagoevgrad. With Litex he won the 2001 Bulgarian Cup.

Honours

Club
Litex Lovech
 Bulgarian Cup: 2000–01

References

1976 births
Living people
Bulgarian footballers
Association football midfielders
PFC Marek Dupnitsa players
F.C. Metalurg Pernik players
PFC Minyor Pernik players
PFC Litex Lovech players
Turan-Tovuz IK players
PFC Slavia Sofia players
PFC Pirin Blagoevgrad players
OFC Vihren Sandanski players
First Professional Football League (Bulgaria) players
Expatriate footballers in Cyprus
Bulgarian expatriates in Portugal
Bulgarian expatriate sportspeople in Azerbaijan
People from Dupnitsa
Sportspeople from Kyustendil Province